Carazinho is a city located 246 km from Porto Alegre, in the northwest portion of the Brazilian state of Rio Grande do Sul. Carazinho was founded on 1931 and as of 2020 has a population of 62,265. Carazinho's primary economy is focused on agriculture. Soybeans, corn and wheat are the major products.

Carazinho can be accessed via BR-285 or BR-386, which are major roads in Rio Grande do Sul.

It has an elevation of 603 meters and an area of 676 km²

A significant part of Carazinho's population is of German origin.

References

Municipalities in Rio Grande do Sul